Nathan Lewis Erdmann (born November 21, 1973) is an American former professional basketball player.

After graduating from Portales High School at Portales, New Mexico in 1993, Erdmann played college basketball at Washington State University, Hutchinson Community College, and the University of Oklahoma. He was selected by the Utah Jazz with the 56th pick in the 1997 NBA Draft as a shooting guard. Erdmann was cut by the Jazz in the Summer League, having not played in a single regular-season game.

Professional career
Erdmann signed with the Idaho Stampede of the Continental Basketball Association in 1997.

He played with the Alerta Cantabria of the Spanish Liga ACB in the 2004–2005 season and for one month in the following season with the Polish team BC Anwil. In December 2005, Erdmann returned to Cantabria.  Nate ended up playing in Euro leagues for 8+ years with stops in Italy (1998–2000 Pallacanestro Biella; 2000 – 2001 De Vizia Avellino; 2001–2003 Pallacanestro Trieste), France (2003–2004 Elan Bearmais Pau-Othez), Spain (2004–2006 Alerta Cantabria), and Poland (2006–2007 Stal Ostrow Wielkopolski).

References

External links
 USA Today article summarizing 1997 NBA Draft shooting guard prospects
Italian league stats for Erdmann

1973 births
Living people
American expatriate basketball people in France
American expatriate basketball people in Italy
American expatriate basketball people in Poland
American expatriate basketball people in Spain
American men's basketball players
Basketball players from Iowa
Cantabria Baloncesto players
Élan Béarnais players
Hutchinson Blue Dragons men's basketball players
Idaho Stampede (CBA) players
KK Włocławek players
Oklahoma Sooners men's basketball players
Pallacanestro Biella players
Pallacanestro Trieste players
S.S. Felice Scandone players
Shooting guards
Sportspeople from Fort Dodge, Iowa
Stal Ostrów Wielkopolski players
Utah Jazz draft picks
Washington State Cougars men's basketball players